Lychas mjobergi is a species of scorpion in the Buthidae family. It is endemic to Australia, and was first described in 1916 by German naturalist Karl Kraepelin following the collection of specimen material from the Kimberley region of Western Australia by Swedish zoologist Eric Mjöberg, for which the species was named.

References

 

 
mjobergi
Scorpions of Australia
Endemic fauna of Australia
Fauna of Western Australia
Animals described in 1916
Taxa named by Karl Kraepelin